Frederick Peterson (October 15, 1878 - January 7, 1970) served in the California State Assembly for the 29th district from 1933 to 1937. During World War I he also served in the United States Army.

References

United States Army personnel of World War I
Republican Party members of the California State Assembly
1878 births
1970 deaths
German emigrants to the United States